John Evans is a special effects artist who was nominated at the 52nd Academy Awards in the category of Best Visual Effects. He was nominated for his work on the film Moonraker, which he shared with Derek Meddings and Paul Wilson.

He worked on nearly 40 films, including, 5 James Bond films, Batman and Gladiator.

References

External links

Special effects people
Living people
Year of birth missing (living people)